The men's K-1 1000 metres event was an individual kayaking event conducted as part of the Canoeing at the 1992 Summer Olympics program.

Medalists

Results

Heats
The 26 competitors first raced in four heats. The top two finishers from each of the heats advanced directly to the semifinals while the remaining competitors competed in the repechages.

Repechages
Three repechages were held. The top three finishers in each repechage and the fastest fourth-place finisher advanced to the semifinals.

The official report had Park qualifying for the semifinals as the fastest fourth-place finisher when it was actually García. Lindén's disqualification was not disclosed in the official report.

Semifinals
The top four finishers from each of the two semifinals along with the fastest fifth-place finisher advanced to the final.

Final
The final took place on August 8.

Robinson stayed closed to Holmann throughout the race, then surged ahead at the end. For the first time in Robinson's life, his body went numb from pushing himself so hard. It took Robinson six hours to produce a urine sample for doping control due to him being so dehydrated after the final.

References
1992 Summer Olympics official report Volume 5. p. 138. 
Sports-reference.com 1992 K-1 1000 m results.
Wallechinsky, David and Jaime Loucky (2008). "Canoeing: Men's Kayak Singles 1000 Meters". In The Complete Book of the Olympics: 2008 Edition. London: Aurum Press Limited. p. 473.

Men's K-1 1000
Men's events at the 1992 Summer Olympics